is a Japanese writer and professor at the Institute of Oriental Culture, Tokyo University, of Japan.

Tanaka is notable for writing about Chinese literature, publishing books that include, among others, The Social and Historical Content of Ming-Ch'ing Local Drama, and Development of Local Plays in the 17th and 18th Centuries,.

Works
 中国祭祀演劇研究. 1981.

References

External links
  "文学博士田仲一成君の 「中国祭祀演劇に関する研究」 に対する" (Archive). The Japan Academy.

20th-century Japanese historians
Living people
Academic staff of the University of Tokyo
1932 births
Japanese sinologists
Historians of China
Members of the Japan Academy
Academic staff of Kanazawa University
University of Tokyo alumni
Writers from Tokyo
21st-century Japanese historians
Scholars of Chinese opera